Kevin Coval is an American poet.

He calls himself a "breakbeat poet" whose love of hip-hop "brought [him] back to Judaism". Besides a poet, he is an activist the founder of Louder Than a Bomb slam poetry festival.

His 2017 collection A People's History of Chicago, whose title is inspired by Howard Zinn's A People's History of the United States, comments in 77 poems, one for each neighborhood in Chicago, on the city, its history, and the people that live in it, from its Native American beginnings and its appropriation by whites to the present day, the inauguration of Rahm Emanuel and the World Series win by the Chicago Cubs. Along the way he comments on Robert de LaSalle's mispronunciation of the Native American word "checagou", which he bastardizes with his "misshapen mouth", erasing its original history.

Coval was removed from his position as artistic director at Young Chicago Authors, an organization that sends professional writers to schools to teach, after accusations that he had ignored sexual assault allegations within the organization.

References

Living people
Jewish American poets
Jewish poets
21st-century American poets
People from Chicago
Year of birth missing (living people)
21st-century American Jews